New World Systems is a public sector software company based in Troy, Michigan and a major manufacturer of computer-aided dispatch software that is primarily used in the United States. It became a part of Tyler Technologies in 2015. Troy, Michigan, is now the headquarters for Tyler's Public Safety Division and the home of the former New World ERP financial employees.

History
New World Systems was founded in 1981 in Troy, Michigan by Larry D. Leinweber.

In November 2015 New World Systems was acquired by Tyler Technologies.

Products
Aegis is software that includes Law Enforcement, Fire and EMS Records Management, Computer Aided Dispatch (CAD), Mobile Computing, Corrections Management, Web-based Information Sharing and Decision Support available on the Microsoft Windows platform and the IBM i platform. Aegis CAD is considered a top-tier option within the United States.

See also

 Computer-aided dispatch
 Records Management

References

Companies based in Troy, Michigan
Software companies based in Michigan
Defunct software companies of the United States
1981 establishments in the United States
1981 establishments in Michigan
Software companies established in 1981
Companies established in 1981